Phonon 2555 Vision is a live video album by Susumu Hirasawa. It contains recordings of the Phonon 2555 shows from 2012, part of the "Phonon" series of Hirasawa concerts. The number on the title represents the year of the performance on the Thai solar calendar.

Overview
The shows featured two guest performers: Yasuhiro Araki and PEVO 1go. Araki was the drummer of Hirasawa's New Wave band P-Model from 1984 to 1987, appearing on Karkador and One Pattern (one song from this period was performed on each show), PEVO 1go is the guitarist of the P-Model/Devo tribute band PEVO, who have collaborated with Hirasawa since the 90s. The concerts were the first to feature guest musicians (outside of singers brought as actors to Interactive Live Shows), since 2000's Philosopher's Propeller shows, and the second "Phonon" concert to do so since the Live Phonon ones from 1999. The instruments of the guests were incorporated on into the Phonon 2555 logo. Hirasawa played a Roland A-500PRO keyboard (later incorporated into his Studio WIRESELF setup) on the shows, the first time he's so live since Phonon 2551 in 2008. In the first and second shows the Fernandes PHOTON guitar was used for guitar solos, while in the third show Hirasawa used the EVO 0101Z guitar, a gift from Hisashi; it was the first show where he used it, and later turned it into his main Talbo guitar.

The Phonon 2555 setlists draw heavily from Hirasawa's soundtrack-related works, as well as rarely performed songs from all of his main solo albums (except Virtual Rabbit) and one from Araki's tenure in P-Model which was grandfathered into Hirasawa's solo repertoire, some of which hadn't appeared in live shows since 1994. All three concerts had the same songs in their setlists, the only changes being the order of performance and switching of two spots from the middle of the shows: A song from either Blue Limbo or Byakkoya - White Tiger Field, and an advance premiere of a song from The Secret of The Flowers of Phenomenon. The titles announced for the unreleased songs were considered tentative, but ended up as the definitive ones. The last show forms the bulk of the DVD, with songs performed only on the first two shows included as bonus tracks: 21 & 23 from the first show, 22 & 24 from the second.

Each show got a low quality, single camera angle live broadcast through dedicated Ustream channels. "Aria", the themes song of the Berserk: The Golden Age Arc film trilogy was released in advance as a bonus on the home video releases of the second film, Battle for Doldrey (both the first Hirasawa release on Blu-ray and the first dedicated video release for regions outside Japan), the version on Phonon 2555 Vision has different angles from those of the Battle for Doldrey version. A logo sticker comes as a bonus with the DVD, whose design is heavily geared toward a "caged Tesla coil" motif.

Track listing

Personnel
Susumu Hirasawa - Vocals, Electric guitars, Acoustic guitar, Keyboard, Personal computer, Laser harp, Mixing console, Production
Guest performers
Yasuhiro Araki - Timpani, Electronic percussion, Wind chimes
PEVO 1go - Electric guitar, Misa Kitara, Zeusaphone
Staff
Masanori Chinzei - Direction, Recording, Mixing, Mastering
Makoto Okada (EASTAGE) - DVD authoring
Syotaro Takami - Translation
Toshifumi "non graph" Nakai - Sleeve Design
Presented by Chaos Union / TESLAKITE: Kenji sato, Rihito Yumoto, Mika Hirano, Kinuko Mochizuki and Misato Oguro

References

External links
Phonon 2555 Vision at NO ROOM - The official site of Susumu Hirasawa (P-MODEL)
Live Report

Susumu Hirasawa albums
2013 video albums